Mary Annette Anderson (July 27, 1874 – May 2, 1922) was an American professor of grammar and history and the first African American woman elected to Phi Beta Kappa.

Anderson was born in Shoreham, Vermont, to William and Philomine (Langlois) Anderson. Her father, a farmer, was a freed slave originally from Virginia, and her mother was a Canadian immigrant of French and Native American ancestry. Anderson was educated at the Northfield School for Young Ladies in Northfield, Massachusetts, before entering Middlebury College in 1895. She graduated in 1899 as valedictorian, becoming the first African American woman elected to Phi Beta Kappa.

Following graduation from Middlebury, Anderson taught at Straight University in New Orleans before being appointed a professor of English grammar and history at Howard University in Washington, D.C. She married Walter Lucius Smith on August 7, 1907, and gave up teaching. She died on May 2, 1922, after a short illness.

References

1874 births
1922 deaths
People from Shoreham, Vermont
Middlebury College alumni
Howard University faculty
American people of French-Canadian descent
Academics from Vermont
20th-century American educators